Nowe Karcze  is a settlement in the administrative district of Gmina Szczaniec, within Świebodzin County, Lubusz Voivodeship, in western Poland.

The settlement has a population of 51.

References

Nowe Karcze